The 2019 First Responder Bowl was a college football bowl game played December 30, 2019, with kickoff at 12:30 p.m. EST (11:30 a.m. local CDT) on ESPN. It was the 10th edition of the First Responder Bowl (although only the ninth to be played, as the 2018 edition of the game was declared a no contest while the game was in the first quarter), and was one of the 2019–20 bowl games concluding the 2019 FBS football season. Sponsored by fire and water cleanup and restoration company Servpro, the game was officially known as the Servpro First Responder Bowl.

The 2019 First Responder Bowl was played in Gerald J. Ford Stadium on the campus of Southern Methodist University in University Park, Texas. The move was necessitated by the National Hockey League's announcement that the league's annual New Year's Day outdoor game would be played in the bowl's normal host stadium, Dallas' Cotton Bowl, which created a scheduling conflict. Ford Stadium previously hosted two editions of the Armed Forces Bowl due to construction at its host stadium, Amon G. Carter Stadium in Fort Worth, Texas.

Teams
The game featured the Western Kentucky Hilltoppers of Conference USA (C-USA) and the Western Michigan Broncos of the Mid-American Conference (MAC). This was the 16th meeting between the two programs, and the first since 1947; Western Michigan led the all-time series, 11–3–1.

Western Kentucky Hilltoppers

Western Kentucky entered the game with an 8–4 record (6–2 in conference). The Hilltoppers finished tied for second place with Marshall in the East Division of C-USA.

Western Michigan Broncos

Western Michigan entered the game with a 7–5 record (5–3 in conference).  The Broncos finished in second place of the West Division of the MAC. Each of their five losses during the regular season were away games.

Game summary

Statistics

References

External links

Game statistics at statbroadcast.com

First Responder Bowl
First Responder Bowl
Western Kentucky Hilltoppers football bowl games
Western Michigan Broncos football bowl games
American football in the Dallas–Fort Worth metroplex
First Responder Bowl
First Responder Bowl